Xianhe Tongzi, also known as Baihe Tongzi, is a Chinese deity who is worshipped in temples and shrines as a spiritual power for getting rid of negative forces, as well as a deity of bravery, determination, intelligence.

According to the Investiture of the Gods, Xianhe Tongzi is an immortal who transformed from an immortal crane. He practiced Taoist cultivation on the mythical Kunlun Mountain, and was said to be the only animal disciple that Yuanshi Tianzun, one of the highest deities in Taoism.

References

Chinese deities
Chinese gods